Sangdil is a Pakistani family drama serial that first aired on Geo Entertainment on 29 February 2016. It is produced by Asif Raza Mir and Babar Javed under their production banner A&B Productions. It features Kiran Haq, Naeem Haq and Ghana Ali in pivotal roles.

Cast
Kiran Haq as Sofia
Ghana Ali as Zoobia
Naeem Haq as Zohaib
Qaiser Khan Nizamani as Touseef
Nazlin Soomro as Farkhanda
Hammad Farooqui as Shahzaib
Hajra Khan as Suhaina
Qurat-ul-Ain as Sonia
Nazli Nasr as Farkhanda
Mehak Ali
Danial Afzal Khan
Gul-e-Rana
Faisal Naqvi
Saqlain Bashr
Parveen Soomro
Shahzaib Ali Khwaja
Danish Wakeel

Production

Release
The show aired twice a week, releasing an hour episode, every Monday & Tuesday at 10:00 PM on Geo Entertainment. From 15 August, runtime of the serial was reduced to half an hour and was aired five times a week as the drama soap Maikay Ki Yaad Na Aaye starts airing at 10:30 PM.

References

External links

 
A&B Entertainment
2016 Pakistani television series debuts